Columbia Turnpike-West Tollhouse is a historic tollhouse located at Greenport in Columbia County, New York.  It was built about 1800 and is a -story, three bay square limestone building with a medium pitched gable roof.  It operated along the Columbia Turnpike and served as the tollkeeper's residence and in use as such until 1907, when the road was turned over to the county and then the state. The state designated the road as New York State Route 23 until that route was realigned southwest towards the Rip Van Winkle Bridge in the 1950s and the segment along the toll house was redesignated as New York State Route 23B.

It was added to the National Register of Historic Places in 2000.

See also
Columbia Turnpike-East Tollhouse

References

Houses on the National Register of Historic Places in New York (state)
Federal architecture in New York (state)
Houses completed in 1800
Houses in Columbia County, New York
Toll houses on the National Register of Historic Places
National Register of Historic Places in Columbia County, New York